The effects of Cyclone Amphan in India were extensive and historic. Cyclone Amphan was the costliest tropical cyclone ever recorded in the North Indian Ocean, and the strongest cyclone ever since the 1999 Odisha Cyclone. It was the first storm, and strongest of the historic 2020 North Indian Ocean cyclone season, the costliest recorded cyclone season. It made landfall in West Bengal with 100 mph winds. Within India, the storm killed 98 people, and caused $13.8 billion (2020 USD).

Background 

Over the next couple of days, the system became more marked as it gradually consolidated further, with bands of deep atmospheric convection wrapping into the system's low-level center.
Moving northwards, the depression continually organized and became a cyclonic storm a few hours later, receiving the name Amphan. Furthermore, the IMD upgraded Amphan to an extremely severe cyclonic storm on their cyclone intensity scale.

On May 18, the IMD classified Amphan as a Super Cyclonic Storm, with 3-minute sustained winds of 240 kph, reaching its peak intensity later that day.

Early on May 20, Amphan went through an eyewall replacement cycle. Amphan was on a weakening trend. Around 5:30 p.m. As it moved further inland, Amphan rapidly weakened. Just six hours after landfall, the JTWC downgraded the storm to a Category 1-equivalent cyclone and issued its final warning on the system, as it became disorganized. On 21 May, Amphan dissipated into a well-marked low pressure area.

Preparations

Odisha 
The government of Odisha directed the magistrates of four districts on 15 May to establish shelter homes for possible evacuees. Odisha Chief Secretary Asit Kumar Tripathy initially identified 403 possible cyclone shelters in areas potentially impacted by Amphan, though 105 served as temporary medical centres for quarantines associated with the concurrent COVID-19 pandemic. Shelters could only be filled to one-third capacity to maintain social distancing guidelines due to the pandemic.

West Bengal 

Social distancing restrictions in West Bengal reduced evacuation capacity in shelters from 500,000 people to 200,000 people. The Kolkata Municipal Corporation located schools and community centres for possible use as temporary shelters to augment evacuation capacity. At least 1,704 shelters were ultimately established in Odisha and more than 2,000 were used in West Bengal, including schools and public buildings.  The government of West Bengal planned to evacuate 200,000 people from their homes by 18 May; nearly 300,000 people evacuated in total from the state, including 200,000 from North 24 Parganas district and more than 40,000 from Sagar Island.

Impact

West Bengal 

In Kolkata, reports of car being overturned, trees uprooted and downed power lines caused into havoc. Some parts of the city remained without power. The streets were waterlogged and trees blocking the roads. Some districts got power in the middle of the night after the storm had passed. The airport was remained shut and became waterlogged, many structural damages were reported. Chief Minister Mamata Banerjee even stated that "a bigger disaster than Covid-19". Netaji Subhash Chandra Bose Airport, Kolkata, recorded highest wind speed of 133 km/h on 20 May 2020. Other parts of Kolkata experienced wind speed of 110–130 km/h.

Odisha 

Although the state have escaped the worst part of the cyclone, it caused significant impact in the Odisha–West Bengal border districts. It affected 4.5 million people in the state. Due to high gust winds and intense rainfall, districts like Bhadrak and Kendrapara suffered especially for the paddy farmers since the paddy fields became unsuitable for paddy cultivation which was inundated by saline water due to storm surge. According to the Odisha Government, 3 million people remained without power due to power outage and it took a while to return to normalcy whereas the roads were being cleared by the National Disaster Response Force (NDRF).

South India 

Rains and strong winds from Amphan swept across many districts in Kerala beginning on May 16. Thunderstorms associated with Amphan caused severe coastal erosion in the Valiyathura suburb of Thiruvananthapuram, damaging roads and destroying homes and threatening to displace over a hundred families from their homes. Strong winds inflicted severe damage in Kottayam district, especially in Vaikom taluk, where homes and temples were impacted and trees and electric poles were downed.

A ₹1.47 billion (US$19.3 million) damage toll resulted from the destruction of 16 homes and the partial damage of 313 homes. A high school used as a homeless shelter collapsed, causing minor injuries.

Tamil Nadu faced some impact from the cyclone. Heavy winds damaged at least 100 boats anchored in the Ramanathapuram district. Coastal erosion from rough seas generated by Amphan led to the collapse of three houses at Bommayarpalayam in Viluppuram district. Roughly 35 acres of banana crops around Gandarvakottai and Aranthangi were destroyed. Northern areas of the state have heatwave-like conditions for a week because Amphan took all of the area's moisture.

In Sooradapeta, near Kakinada in Andhra Pradesh, rough seas destroyed 35 homes and damaged several others.

Aftermath

International Relief
German NGO Welthungerlife released 100,000 Euro to fund Cyclone Amphan relief efforts.

West Bengal 

On 22 May, Prime Minister Narendra Modi conducted an aerial survey over Kolkata, along with Chief Minister Mamata Banerjee. Modi announced a ₹10 billion (US$132 million) immediate relief package for West Bengal and ₹5 billion (US$66.2 million) in relief for Odisha. In advance, Modi announced that ₹200,000 (US$2,650) would be provided to the next of kin of people who died during the storm, and ₹50,000 (US$660) would be given to each injured person. West Bengal CM Banerjee stated that it would take three to four days to assess the damage. Twenty disaster relief teams were dispatched by the Indian Coast Guard to begin search and rescue operations. Ten teams were sent to West Bengal to aid recovery, in addition to the NDRF teams pre-positioned there before Amphan's passage. Also since most of the water pumps are operated in electricity and due to no electricity, several district suffered from water shortage which caused additional protest.  Approximately 1,000 ground teams worked to restore infrastructure and services in West Bengal after Amphan, though only 25–30 percent of workers were staffed due to the COVID-19 pandemic. The resulting slow restoration of power sparked protests across West Bengal aimed primarily at electricity company CESC. Some restoration efforts were disrupted by these protests. The Home Department of West Bengal requested additional crews from railway and port interest, while five brigades from the Indian Army were deployed in Kolkata and the 24 Parganas districts to support recovery efforts. The government of Odisha sent 500 members of its disaster rapid action force and fire service to West Bengal.

The European Union stated that it would initially provide €500,000 (US$545,000) for those affected by the storm in India.

Odisha 
Additional assistance was requested from Jharkhand and Odisha. Odisha Chief Minister Naveen Patnaik performed an aerial survey of the damage in his state following Amphan.

See also

Tropical cyclones in 2020
 Tropical cyclones in India
 2020 North Indian Ocean cyclone season
 List of Bangladesh tropical cyclones
 List of notable tropical cyclones
 List of North Indian cyclone seasons
 Cyclone Amphan (2020) — For more information about Cyclone Amphan
 Effects of the 2020 North Indian cyclone season in India
 Cyclone Sidr (2007) — A storm that had a similar intensity, took a similar track, and devastated similar areas.
 1999 Odisha Cyclone — A storm which became the most intense tropical cyclone in the basin.
Cyclone Aila (2009) — A cyclone that devastated India and Bangladesh
Cyclone Phailin (2013) — Took a similar path and devastated Odisha
Cyclone Bulbul (2019) — A cyclone that made a landfall in West Bengal just a year before Amphan
1970 Bhola cyclone — Took a similar track and devastated Bangladesh

References

2020 natural disasters
Disasters in India
Tropical cyclones in 2020
Tropical cyclones in India
Category 2 tropical cyclones